In particle physics, the Wess–Zumino gauge is a particular choice of a gauge transformation in a gauge theory with supersymmetry. In this gauge, the supersymmetrized gauge transformation is chosen in such a way that most components of the vector superfield vanish, except for the usual physical ones when the function of the superspace is expanded in terms of components.

See also
 Supersymmetric gauge theory

Supersymmetric quantum field theory
Gauge theories